Hamid Lotfollahian is an Iranian politician and the former mayor of Ardabil. He is elected by the Islamic City Council of Ardabil in June 2015 and was inaugurated in July 2015. Lotfollahian was former director technical office of governor of Ardabil and mayor districts of Ardabil. According to him traffic master plan in Ardabil is being prepared.

References

Living people
1973 births
People from Ardabil
Mayors of Ardabil
Gazi University alumni